Pacific Coastal Mountain icefields and tundra is a tundra ecoregion in Alaska, British Columbia, and Yukon, as defined by the World Wildlife Fund (WWF) categorization system.

Setting
This ecoregion occupies the rugged slopes of the Coast Ranges, stretching from the Kenai Peninsula of south-central Alaska to Portland Inlet in British Columbia. Glaciers and subpolar icefields are the dominant physiographic influences of this ecoregion.

Climate
At lower elevations this ecoregion has a subarctic climate (Köppen  Dfc ) with cool summers and cold winters. At higher elevations this ecoregion has a tundra climate (Köppen  ET ) with cold summers and very cold winters. The mean annual temperature is -0.5°C (31.1°F), with an average summer temperature of 10°C (50°F) and an average winter temperature of -11.5°C (11.3°F).

Ecology

Flora
Much of the ecoregion at lies beneath glaciers and icefields and is largely devoid of vegetation. Where the ground is vegetated, communities are dominated by dwarf and low shrub communities, including mountain heath and ericaceous shrubs. Subalpine forests of alpine fir, mountain hemlock, and Sitka spruce dominate middle elevations. Forests of western hemlock, subalpine fir and Sitka spruce dominate lower elevations. Forests on the Kenai Peninsula represent a transitional forest type between coastal temperate rainforests characteristic of coastal areas and boreal forest and taiga communities characteristic of interior Alaska.

Fauna
Mammals found throughout the lower to middle elevations of this ecoregion include American black bear, grizzly bear, moose, wolf, black-tailed deer, mountain goat, otter, wolverine, and marmot. Birds inhabiting this ecoregion include arctic tern, spruce grouse, ptarmigan, and gull.

The isthmus of the Kenai Peninsula holds special ecological interest as region where species from differing ecoregions intermix.

Threats and preservation
Human-caused climate change has dramatically increased the rate of glacial retreat within this ecoregion, even with the counterbalance of naturally heavy snowfall. Threats to wildlife include the loss of land area to sea-level rise, scouring of river beds by heavy snowmelt, saltwater intrusion into bodies of freshwater, and pollinator decline. Other threats include logging of old-growth forests and mining.

Protected areas
Some of the largest protected areas of this ecoregion include:
Atlin Provincial Park and Recreation Area
Chugach State Park
Glacier Bay National Park and Preserve
Kluane National Park and Reserve
Tongass National Forest
Wrangell–Saint Elias Wilderness

See also
List of ecoregions in Canada (WWF)
List of ecoregions in the United States (WWF)

References

External links 
 

Ecozones and ecoregions of British Columbia
Ecozones and ecoregions of Yukon
Nearctic ecoregions
Tundra ecoregions